USPSA may refer to:

 United States Practical Shooting Association
 United States Power Soccer Association